Dategad Fort is a small fort located  South of Satara, in the Maharashtra state of India. This fort can be visited in a day from Satara. The nearest town is Patan. The base village is Tolewadi from where an easy trek of 45 minutes leads to the entrance of the fort.

History
The Patankars were the Deshmukhs under the Marathas of the whole surrounding district and had charge of Dategad fort. The fort was under the control of Maratha dynasty before the fort was taken into control by Captain Grant in May 1818.

Places to see
The fort is located on a high tableland with escarpments on all the sides. The scarp is about 30 feet high. There is an entrance gate to enter the table land. One has to climb 20 steps to reach the top of the fort. The fort is spread over an area of 3 acres. There are 10 feet tall idols of Lord Hanuman and Lord Ganapati on the fort. There is a Shivalinga carved in the laterite stone near the well. The well is 100 feet deep cut in the laterite rock. There are two large water tanks on the fort.

See also
 List of forts in Maharashtra
 List of forts in India
 Marathi People
 List of Maratha dynasties and states
 Maratha War of Independence
 Battles involving the Maratha Empire

References

Buildings and structures of the Maratha Empire
Forts in Maharashtra
Forts in Satara district
16th-century forts in India
Caves of Maharashtra
Tourist attractions in Satara district
Indian rock-cut architecture